The Committee on Development (Commission du développement, DEVE) is a committee of the European Parliament responsible for promoting, implementing and monitoring the development and cooperation policy of the European Union, notably talks with developing countries; aid to developing countries; and promotion of democratic values, good governance and human rights in developing countries.

The committee has thirty-four members and the same number of substitute members. Its current chair, elected on 10 July 2019, is Tomas Tobé.

Chair 
2019– : Tomas Tobé 
2014–2019: Linda McAvan
2009–2014: Eva Joly
2007–2009: Josep Borrell
1997–1999: Michel Rocard

See also
 European Development Fund

References

External links
 Official Webpage

Development